Sarlak (Sarlaq) is a rural locality (a village) in Meleuzovsky Selsoviet, Meleuzovsky District, Bashkortostan, Russia. The population was 334 as of 2010. There are 6 streets.

Geography 
Sarlak is located 7 km north of Meleuz (the district's administrative centre) by road. Meleuz is the nearest rural locality.

References 

Rural localities in Meleuzovsky District